Rion may refer to:

Surname
 Chanel Rion (born 1990), American journalist
 Francis Rion (born 1933), Belgian international football referee
 José Luis Rion (born 1952), Mexican rower
 Raicu Ionescu-Rion (1872–1895), Romanian literarist

Given name
 Rion Amilcar Scott, American short story writer
 Rion Azuma (born 1996), Japanese singer
 Rion Brown (born 1991), American basketball player 
 Rion Taki (born 1992), Japanese football player 
 Rion Sumiyoshi (born 2003), Japanese figure skater

Other
 Galerians: Rion, 2002 animated film
 Rion Hall, historic building
 Rion, South Carolina
 Rion-des-Landes
 Tone Rion, vocaloid

See also
 Rio, Greece, also known as Rion
 Rioni River, also known as the Rion River
 Rions, commune in the Gironde department in Nouvelle-Aquitaine in southwestern France
 The Rions, an Australian indie rock band

Japanese unisex given names